Webster "Webby" Leotis Garrison (born August 24, 1965) is an American former professional baseball infielder and current Minor League Baseball coach/manager in the Oakland Athletics farm system.

Playing career
Born in Marrero, Louisiana, Garrison was drafted by the Toronto Blue Jays in the 2nd round of the 1983 amateur draft.

In 5 career games, he had 9 at-bats and no hits.

Coaching career
Garrison began his coaching career in 1999 with the Athletics Double-A Midland RockHounds. During the 1999 season in Midland, Garrison served as one of the rare player-coach, playing in 43 games while acting as the hitting coach for the team. From 2011 to 2013 he managed the Stockton Ports. In 2015, he managed the Nashville Sounds and in 2016 and 2017, the Arizona League Athletics, before being promoted to manager of the Class A Beloit Snappers for 2018.

He was named "Banner Island Ballpark All-Time Manager" in 2015.

References

External links

1965 births
Living people
African-American baseball managers
African-American baseball players
American expatriate baseball players in Canada
Baseball players from Louisiana
Colorado Springs Sky Sox players
Dunedin Blue Jays players
Edmonton Trappers players
Florence Blue Jays players
Huntsville Stars players
Kinston Blue Jays players
Knoxville Blue Jays players
Midland RockHounds players
Minor league baseball managers
Oakland Athletics players
People from Marrero, Louisiana
Syracuse Chiefs players
Tacoma Tigers players
21st-century African-American people
20th-century African-American sportspeople